was a Japanese film director.

Biography
He is known for directing many jidaigeki television dramas. In 1950, he joined the Daiei studio and started working as an assistant director. He made his director debut with Yureikoban in 1960. He directed a lot of jidaigeki television dramas from 1970s to 1980s.

In 1993, he directed Lone Wolf and Cub series film Lone Wolf and Cub: Final Conflict, it was for the first time in 23 years he directed in the film.

Inoue died from a cerebral infarction and pneumonia on 9 January 2022, at the age of 93.

Selected filmography

Film 
 Yurei Koban (1960) ) (First film  Inoue directed.)
Zatoichi's Revenge (1965)
 Dr.Strong-arm (1966)
 Sleepy Eyes of Death 7: The Mask of the Princess (1966)
 The Whimsy of Cupid (1967)
 An Invitation to Jail (1967)
 Rikugun Nakano gakko: Mitsumei (1967) 
 Rikugun Nakano gakkô: Kaisen zen'ya (1968) 
 Woman's Prison'7 (1968)
 Duel at the Quay aka Kanto onna yakuza (1968)
 Kanto onna do konjo (1969)
 Lone Wolf and Cub: Final Conflict (1993)
 Konuka Ame (2017)
 Korosuna'' (2022)

Television 
Nemuri Kyōshirō (TV series) (1972) Episode 1, 6, 10, 12, 17, 18, 24, 26
Unmeitōge (1974)
Zatoichi Monogatari (1974-78)
Nemuri Kyoshiro: Conspiracy at Edo Castle (1993)
Kawaite sōrō Hahawa Ikiteita? (1993)
Nemuri Kyoshiro: The Woman Who Loved Kyoshiro (1998)
Kenkaku Shobai Sukedachi (2004)

References

External links

1928 births
2022 deaths
People from Kyoto
Japanese film directors
Samurai film directors
Yakuza film directors
Deaths from pneumonia in Japan